Peter Leo Ireton (September 21, 1882 – April 27, 1958) was an American prelate of the Roman Catholic Church. He served as bishop of the Diocese of Richmond in Virginia from 1945 until his death in 1958.

Biography

Early life 
Ireton was born on September 21, 1882, in Baltimore, Maryland to John and Mary (née Sheridan) Ireton; his father was from County Wexford, Ireland. He studied at St. Charles College in Catonsville, Maryland, and at St. Mary's Seminary in Baltimore. 

Ireton was ordained to the priesthood for the Archdiocese of Baltimore by Cardinal James Gibbons on June 20, 1906. He then studied for a year at the Apostolic Mission House in Washington, D.C. Returning to Baltimore, Ireton served as a curate at St. Gregory's Parish in Baltimore until 1926, when he became pastor of St. Ann's Parish in Baltimore. He became instrumental in founding the Junior Holy Name Society and the Big Brother Movement. He was named a domestic prelate with the title of monsignor by the Vatican in 1929.

Coadjutor Bishop and Bishop of Richmond 
On August 3, 1935, Ireton was appointed coadjutor bishop and apostolic administrator of the Diocese of Richmond and titular bishop of Cyme by Pope Pius XI. He received his episcopal consecration at the Baltimore Cathedral on October 23, 1935.  His principal consecrator was Archbishop Michael Curley, with Bishops Thomas O'Reilly and James Ryan serving as co-consecrators. 

Following the resignation of Bishop Andrew Brennan, Ireton automatically became the ninth bishop of Richmond on April 14, 1945. Ireton was named by the Vatican as an assistant at the pontifical throne in 1956. During his tenure as bishop, Ireton established 42 parishes, built 24 schools, and increased the Catholic population from 37,000 to 147,000.

Death and legacy 
On April 26, 1958, Ireton became very ill after giving a presentation at Marymount University in Arlington, Virginia and was rushed to Georgetown University Hospital in Washington, D.C.  Peter Ireton died the next day at age 75.Bishop Ireton High School in Alexandria, Virginia is named in his honor.

References

1882 births
1958 deaths
Religious leaders from Baltimore
Roman Catholic bishops of Richmond
20th-century Roman Catholic bishops in the United States
St. Charles College alumni
St. Mary's Seminary and University alumni